Celozzi-Ettleson Chevrolet was a Chevrolet dealership located in Elmhurst, Illinois. Advertised that it was the "#1 Chevy dealer in the nation", it was owned by Nick Celozzi and Maury Ettleson and operated at the corner of York and Roosevelt roads from February 1968 to October 2000.

Well known for its local TV commercials featuring the owners displaying a large amount of cash in hand and advertising the dealership as the place "Where you always save more money," the dealership was originally Zepalack Chevrolet, and the actual address was 155 E. Roosevelt Road, although there was no direct access to the dealership from Roosevelt Road.  In its heyday, the dealership spent $1 million a year on television ads. Its commercials have been noted by the Chicago Tribune as memorable for all who grew up with them.

The duo became so famous that they even starred in commercials advertising other products, including Bud Light and Pizza Hut (revising their tagline to say "Where you always get great pepperoni!")

Celozzi and Ettleson sold the dealership and parted ways in 2000.  Gabor Bushy, who was the owner of Suburban Buick in nearby Wheaton, Illinois, purchased the dealership and renamed it Elmhurst Chevrolet.  Several years later, the dealership relocated farther west on Roosevelt Road and became Villa Park Chevrolet (currently Castle Chevrolet of Villa Park).  The building that was "Hard to find, but tough to beat" has since been demolished.  Elmhurst Memorial Healthcare has built a major medical center there to replace the current Elmhurst Memorial Hospital.  The site was annexed into Elmhurst, Illinois on March 3, 2008.

Ettleson currently owns Ettleson Cadillac-Buick-GMC and Ettleson Hyundai in Hodgkins with his son Michael Ettleson. Celozzi owned Celozzi Ford and Celozzi Chrysler in Waukegan until 2003, when he was forced to declare bankruptcy and shutter the dealerships after one of his former business partners was indicted on fraud charges.

See also
Eagle Insurance
Empire Today
Victory Auto Wreckers
Moo & Oink
Peter Francis Geraci
Walter E. Smithe

References

External links
Sherman Dodge Website
 Interview With Nick Celozzi
Article on the Celozzi-Ettleson Commercials 
Celozzi-Ettleson Commercial From 1984 on YouTube

Elmhurst, Illinois
Culture of Chicago
Auto dealerships of the United States
Former auto dealerships
Chevrolet